Benito Concepcion "Benny" Ricardo (born January 4, 1954 in Asunción, Paraguay) is a former American football placekicker in the NFL (1976-1984) for the Buffalo Bills, Detroit Lions, New Orleans Saints, Minnesota Vikings, and the San Diego Chargers.  He played college football at San Diego State University. He is distinguished as being the first Paraguayan to play in the National Football League. As a Minnesota Viking, Ricardo led the NFC in scoring in 1983 with 108 points.

Personal life
Ricardo is a sometimes-actor who also has appeared in the motion pictures North Dallas Forty and Wildcats. Ricardo is also a stand-up comedian and NFL and boxing commentator, and the only bilingual announcer to have announced network events as both the lead announcer and color commentator in both Spanish and English. Ricardo has announced every major sporting event in the world while working for networks like ESPN, Fox Sports, CBS Sports, MSG Networks, Westwood One, Integrated Media, Fightnow TV, Televisa, NBC, MultiVision Media, Top Rank, CSI Sports, Primetime, M1-Global, Affliction. As of 2014, Ricardo is a color commentator on CBS NFL broadcasts and also calls fights for CBS Sports Network and ESPN. Ricardo is married to former Playboy Playmate Monique Noel. He is known to associate with Steve Watson.

References

1954 births
Living people
Sportspeople from Asunción
Paraguayan players of American football
American football placekickers
San Diego State Aztecs football players
Buffalo Bills players
Detroit Lions players
New Orleans Saints players
Minnesota Vikings players
San Diego Chargers players
Southern California Sun players